In Greek mythology, Narcissus (Ancient Greek: Νάρκισσος Nárkissos) was a hunter from Thespiae in Boeotia (alternatively Mimas or modern day Karaburun, Izmir) who was known for his beauty. According to Tzetzes, he rejected all romantic advances, eventually falling in love with his own reflection in a pool of water, staring at it for the remainder of his life. After he died, in his place sprouted a flower bearing his name.

The character of Narcissus is the origin of the term narcissism, a fixation with oneself. This quality, in turn, contributes to the definition of narcissistic personality disorder, a psychiatric condition marked by grandiosity, excessive need for attention and admiration, and an inability to empathize.

Like the myth of Laius and Chrysippus, the myth of Narcissus is a Boeotian pederastic cautionary tale, a story meant to teach by counter-example.

Etymology 
The name is of Greek etymology. According to R. S. P. Beekes, "[t]he suffixes [-ισσος] clearly points to a Pre-Greek word." The word narcissus has come to be used for the daffodil, but there is no clarity on whether the flower is named for the myth or the myth for the flower, or if there is any true connection at all. Pliny the Elder wrote that the plant was named for its fragrance ("I grow numb"), not the youth.

Family 
In some versions, Narcissus was the son of the river god Cephissus and nymph Liriope, while Nonnus instead has him as the son of the lunar goddess Selene and her mortal lover Endymion.

Mythology 
Several versions of the myth have survived from ancient sources, most notable, one from a Greek traveler and geographer of the second century AD named Pausanias and a more popular one by Ovid, (supposedly rewritten from Pausanias version as a Roman myth) found in Book 3 of his Metamorphoses. This is the story of Echo and Narcissus. When Liriope gave birth to the handsome child Narcissus, she consulted the seer Tiresias, who predicted that the boy would live a long life only if he never discovered himself. One day Narcissus was walking in the woods when Echo, an Oread (mountain nymph) saw him, fell deeply in love, and followed him. Narcissus sensed he was being followed and shouted "Who's there?". Echo repeated "Who's there?" She eventually revealed her identity and attempted to embrace him. He stepped away and told her to leave him alone. She was heartbroken and spent the rest of her life in lonely glens until nothing but an echo sound remained of her. Nemesis (as an aspect of Aphrodite), the goddess of revenge, noticed this behaviour after learning the story and decided to punish Narcissus. Once, during the summer, he was getting thirsty after hunting, and the goddess lured him to a pool where he leaned upon the water and saw himself in the bloom of youth. Narcissus did not realize it was merely his own reflection and fell deeply in love with it, as if it were another young man. Unable to leave the allure of his image, he eventually realized that his love could not be reciprocated and he melted away from the fire of passion burning inside him, eventually turning into a gold and white flower.

An earlier version ascribed to the poet Parthenius of Nicaea, composed around 50 BC, was discovered in 2004 by Dr Benjamin Henry among the Oxyrhynchus papyri at Oxford. Unlike Ovid's version, it ended with Narcissus who lost his will to live and committed suicide. A version by Conon, a contemporary of Ovid, also ends in suicide (Narrations, 24). In it, a young man named Ameinias fell in love with Narcissus, who had already spurned his male suitors. Narcissus also spurned him and gave him a sword. Ameinias committed suicide at Narcissus's doorstep. He had prayed to the gods to give Narcissus a lesson for all the pain he provoked. Narcissus walked by a pool of water and decided to drink some. He saw his reflection, became entranced by it, and killed himself because he could not have his object of desire. A century later the travel writer Pausanias recorded a novel variant of the story, in which Narcissus falls in love with his twin sister rather than himself. In all versions, his body disappears and all that is left is a narcissus flower.

Influence on culture 
The myth of Narcissus has inspired artists for at least two thousand years, even before the Roman poet Ovid featured a version in book III of his Metamorphoses. This was followed in more recent centuries by other poets (e.g. Keats and Alfred Edward Housman) and painters (Caravaggio, Poussin, Turner, Dalí (see Metamorphosis of Narcissus), and Waterhouse).

Literature 

In Stendhal's novel Le Rouge et le Noir (1830), there is a classic narcissist in the character of Mathilde. Says Prince Korasoff to Julien Sorel, the protagonist, with respect to his beloved girl:

She looks at herself instead of looking at you, and so doesn't know you.
During the two or three little outbursts of passion she has allowed herself in your favor, she has, by a great effort of imagination, seen in you the hero of her dreams, and not yourself as you really are.
(Page 401, 1953 Penguin Edition, trans. Margaret R.B. Shaw).

The myth had a decided influence on English Victorian homoerotic culture, via André Gide's study of the myth, Le Traité du Narcisse ('The Treatise of the Narcissus', 1891), and the only novel by Oscar Wilde, The Picture of Dorian Gray.

Paulo Coelho's The Alchemist also starts with a story about Narcissus, found (we are told) by the alchemist in a book brought by someone in the caravan. The alchemist's (and Coelho's) source was very probably Hesketh Pearson's The Life of Oscar Wilde (1946) in which this story is recorded (Penguin edition, p. 217) as one of Wilde's inspired inventions. This version of the Narcissus story is based on Wilde's "The Disciple" from his "Poems in Prose (Wilde) ".

Author and poet Rainer Maria Rilke visits the character and symbolism of Narcissus in several of his poems.

Seamus Heaney references Narcissus in his poem "Personal Helicon" from his first collection "Death of a Naturalist":To stare, big-eyed Narcissus, into some spring
Is beneath all adult dignity.

In Rick Riordan's Heroes of Olympus series, Narcissus appears as a minor antagonist in the third book The Mark of Athena.

William Faulkner's character "Narcissa" in Sanctuary, sister of Horace Benbow, was also named after Narcissus. Throughout the novel, she allows the arrogant, pompous pressures of high-class society to overrule the unconditional love that she should have for her brother.

Hermann Hesse's character "Narcissus" in "Narcissus and Goldmund" shares several of mythical Narcissus' traits, although his narcissism is based on his intellect rather than his physical beauty.

A. E. Housman refers to the 'Greek Lad', Narcissus, in his poem "Look not in my Eyes" from A Shropshire Lad set to music by several English composers including George Butterworth. At the end of the poem stands a jonquil, a variety of daffodil, Narcissus jonquilla, which like Narcissus looks sadly down into the water.

Herman Melville references the myth of Narcissus in his novel Moby-Dick, in which Ishmael explains the myth as "the key to it all," referring to the greater theme of finding the essence of Truth through the physical world.

On Sophia de Mello Breyner Andresen's A Fada Oriana, the eponymous protagonist is punished with mortality for abandoning her duties in order to stare at herself in the surface of a river.

Joseph Conrad's novel The Nigger of the 'Narcissus' features a merchant ship named Narcissus. An incident involving the ship, and the difficult decisions made by the crew, explore themes involving self-interest vs. altruism and humanitarianism.

Naomi Iizuka's play Polaroid Stories, a contemporary rewrite of the Orpheus and Eurydice myth, features Narcissus as a character. In the play he is portrayed as a self obsessed, and drug addicted young man who was raised on the streets. He is alluded to being a member of the LGBT+ community and mentions his sexual endeavours with older men, some ending with the death of these men due to drug overdoses. He is accompanied by the character Echo, whom he continuously spurns.

Film and television

Depictions and retellings
Scottish-Canadian animator Norman McLaren finished his career with a short film named Narcissus, re-telling the Greek legend through ballet.

Narcissus appears in the Disney adaptation of Hercules. In the film, he is portrayed as an Olympian god with purple skin.

In the film Bab'Aziz, directed by Nacer Khemir, a Narcissus like character was portrayed by an ancient prince who sat by a pond for days after days and looked at the reflection of his own soul. He was referred to as 'The prince who contemplated his soul'.

The Neon Demon, a 2016 psychological horror film by Nicolas Winding Refn, is loosely based on the story of Narcissus.

Other references
In the TV series Boardwalk Empire, a Dr. Narcisse (Valentin Narcisse) is introduced as a condescending intellectual.

Pink Narcissus is an artistic film by James Bidgood about the fantasies of a hustler.

The escape craft Ripley boards in the 1979 Ridley Scott film Alien is called the Narcissus.

Narcissus is the name of Laurel and Hardy's goat in their 1940 film Saps At Sea.

Narcissus is the name of the host club in the 2018 Japanese drama Todome no Kiss. The lead character, Otaro Dojima (Kento Yamazaki), works in the nightclub as a sought-after host under the stage name Eight and just like Narcissus, he is narcissistic and disregards the feelings of others; he uses women for money and power.

Music 
 "Narcissus" is a popular melody from Water Scenes by American composer Ethelbert Nevin.
 The song "Mud and Dark" by the Cocteau Twins is based on the myth of Narcissus, and retells Metamorphoses depiction of Echo
 In Gilbert and Sullivan's opera Patience, the ldyllic poet Archibald Grosvenor calls himself “a very Narcissus” after gazing at his own reflection.
 Composer Nikolai Tcherepnin wrote his ballet "Narcisse et Echo, Op. 40" in 1911 for Sergei Diaghilev's Ballets Russes and was danced by Nijinski. Uruguayan band El Cuarteto de Nos wrote the song "Me Amo" (I Love Myself) in which the chorus sings "como Narciso soy" (I am like Narcissus). In 2010, Swedish electronic artist pacific! released "Narcissus" an album and ballet staged in Gothenburg. In 1994, composer Mark Applebaum composed Narcissus: Strata/Panacea for marimba solo.  This work comprised one movement of the larger Janus Cycle, for mixed instrumentation. In 1987, Thea Musgrave was commissioned by a consortium of four flutists for a solo work.  She composed Narcissus for flute and digital delay.
 The fifth of Benjamin Britten's Six Metamorphoses after Ovid for solo oboe (1951) is titled "Narcissus", "who fell in love with his own image and became a flower".
 German composer Matthias Pintscher composed his first cello concerto based on this mythology figure, titled Reflections on Narcissus.
 National Medal Of Arts recipient Morten Lauridsen wrote a choral work entitled "Dirait-on" based on the poem by Rainer Maria Rilke.
 "Supper's Ready" by Genesis (ca. 1972), a near-23-minute epic song laden with religious and mythological imagery, refers to the myth of Narcissus as follows:  A young figure sits still by the pool / He's been stamped "Human Bacon" by some butchery tool / (He is you) / Social Security took care of this lad. / We watch in reverence, as Narcissus is turned to a flower. / A flower?. The movement is titled "How Dare I Be So Beautiful?".
 Folk group Indigo Girls mention Narcissus their song Hammer and a Nail, released in 1990 on their album Nomads Indians Saints.
 Progressive metal band Threshold referenced the myth with an 11-minute epic titled "Narcissus", the closing track on their album Hypothetical. Greek metal band Septic Flesh recorded a song about Narcissus (called "Narcissus") on their album Communion.
 The cerebral rock band "Glass Wave" retells the Narcissus story from the perspective of the nymph Echo in their song "Echo," from their self-titled album "Glass Wave" (2010).
 "Narcissus in a Red Dress" by The Like was released on The Like EP and their album Release Me. The Canadian band Hedley has written a song about Narcissus (called "Narcissist"). One line goes He falls in love with his reflection in the glass / He can't resist who's staring back
 In Marilyn Manson's song "Deep Six", the first verse mentions Zeus in conversation with Narcissus.
 Alanis Morissette has a song named "Narcissus" on the album Under Rug Swept.
 Narcissus is the sixth mini album by a K-pop band SF9. It was released on February 20, 2019, with "Enough" serving as the album's title track. The English version of this song was supposed to be titled "Superior" but eventually the original title prevailed. The physical album comes in two versions: Temptation and Emptiness.
 O. N. V. Kurup uses Nacissus story in the song "Indraneelima" from Vaishali. The first line tells the story of Narcissus who reflects his face in the water.
 Weyes Blood takes inspiration from the myth in her song "God Turn Me Into A Flower", using Narcissus as a metaphor for love in the age of technology.

Visual art 

Narcissus has been a subject for many painters such as Caravaggio, Poussin, Turner, Dalí, Waterhouse, Carpioni, Lagrenée, and Roos.

Sculptors such as Paul Dubois, John Gibson, Henri-Léon Gréber, Benvenuto Cellini and Hubert Netzer have sculpted Narcissus.

See also 
 Egocentrism
 Narcissism
 Narcissistic personality disorder
 Narcissus (plant)

References

Modern sources 
 
 
 
 
  On-line version
  On-line version .

External links 
 
 Papyrology UK

Boeotian characters in Greek mythology
Children of Potamoi
Children of Selene
Fictional characters with psychiatric disorders
Mythological hunters
LGBT themes in Greek mythology
Narcissism
Metamorphoses into flowers in Greek mythology
Personifications in Greek mythology